Glady Fork is a  river in the Allegheny Mountains of eastern West Virginia, USA.  It is considered one of the five principal headwaters tributaries of the Cheat River — known as the Forks of Cheat.

Geography
With the Dry Fork, the Laurel Fork, the Shavers Fork and the Blackwater River, it is considered one of the five principal headwaters tributaries of the Cheat. The stream was named for the presence of glades along the river.

The Glady Fork is formed at the community of Glady in Randolph County by the confluence of two short northward-flowing streams known as East Fork Glady Fork and West Fork Glady Fork; the forks flow from a ridge known as Lynn Divide which separates the Cheat River watershed in Randolph County from the Greenbrier River watershed in Pocahontas County.  From the confluence the Glady Fork flows north-northeastwardly in a meandering course between Middle Mountain and Shavers Mountain in the Monongahela National Forest, through eastern Randolph County into southern Tucker County, where it joins the Dry Fork at the community of Gladwin.

According to the West Virginia Department of Environmental Protection, nearly 94% of the Glady Fork's watershed is forested, mostly deciduous.  The lower half of the river's course is characterized by continuous Class 2 rapids, with Class 3 whitewater in the lowermost three-to-four miles (5–6 km).

See also
List of West Virginia rivers

References

Monongahela National Forest
Rivers of Randolph County, West Virginia
Rivers of West Virginia
Rivers of Tucker County, West Virginia